James Watkins (born September 25, 1954) is an American retired professional darts player, who played in Professional Darts Corporation events.

Career
Watkins was brought in to make up the numbers in the inaugural 1994 WDC World Darts Championship, and lost to Phil Taylor and Jamie Harvey. He also played the following year, losing both his first round matches.

He reached the quarter-finals in the inaugural World Matchplay in 1994, beating Steve Brown and Keith Deller, before losing to Rod Harrington.

World Championship performances

PDC
 1994: Last 24 Group (lost to Phil Taylor 0–3) and (beat Jamie Harvey 2–3)
 1995: Last 24 Group (lost to Steve Brown 0–3) and (lost to Jamie Harvey 2–3)

References

External links

1954 births
Living people
American darts players
Professional Darts Corporation associate players